Roman Igorevich Bugayev (born 11 February 1989) is a Russian professional football player.

Club career
He made his Russian Premier League debut for FC Kuban Krasnodar on 23 April 2011 in a game against FC Volga Nizhny Novgorod.

External links
 

1989 births
People from Bratsk
Living people
Russian footballers
Russia national football B team footballers
Association football midfielders
FC Kuban Krasnodar players
Russian Premier League players
FC Armavir players
FC Rotor Volgograd players
FC Tom Tomsk players
FC Yenisey Krasnoyarsk players
Sportspeople from Irkutsk Oblast